Hasoo Balel (حسو بلیل, Hassu Balail) is a town of Tehsil Ahmadpur Sial Tehsil in Jhang District of Punjab province of Pakistan. The town is located near the River Chenab after the River Jehlam merges with this river. The town is located on the Jhang-Layyah Road Jhang Sadar.

Populated places in Jhang District
Jhang District